Rabbi Yosef Eliyahu Henkin (1881–1973) was a prominent Orthodox rabbi in the United States.

Biography 
He was born in 1881 in Klimavichy, Belarus, then in the Russian Empire, and studied at the Slutzker Yeshiva under Rabbi Isser Zalman Meltzer. He received rabbinical ordination (semichah) from Rabbi Meltzer, and he was also ordained by Rabbi Yaakov Dovid Wilovsky (the Ridvaz), Rabbi Boruch Ber Leibowitz and Rabbi Yechiel Michel Epstein, the Aruch HaShulchan. However, according to the recollections of a student (included in the responsa of Rabbi Henkin's grandson), Rabbi Henkin did not remember receiving ordination from Rabbi Epstein, and for his ordination from Rabbi Wilovsky he was not tested by Wilovsky himself, but by Wilovsky's son-in-law. After serving as rabbi in a number of Russian towns, he emigrated to America in 1922. In 1925 he became the director of Ezras Torah, which provided assistance to scholars. He served in that capacity until his death.

Under his guidance, and following his decisions, Ezras Torah published an annual calendar (luach) listing the synagogue and liturgical customs for each day, specifying the specific practice of that day. Most traditional non-chassidic synagogues in North America followed the decisions of Rabbi Henkin as their baseline. 

He had two sons: Louis Henkin, legal academician and writer, and Rabbi Hillel Henkin, educator in Connecticut. His grandson was Rabbi Yehuda Herzl Henkin, an Orthodox rabbi in Israel. Many of Rabbi Yosef Eliyahu Henkin's opinions are only known through the responsa of his grandson.

Halachic Positions
Rabbi Henkin considered Reform marriage as a form of common law marriage requiring a Jewish divorce (get).

He was opposed to the practice seen in many yeshivas and synagogues of pausing in the middle of the Rosh Hashanah services for kiddush and refreshments before shofar-blowing.  (His stance is defended in his grandson's responsa.)

If a Jewish storekeeper completed a form to sell his chametz to a non-Jew before Passover, yet he kept his store open, selling chametz on Passover and keeping the profits for himself, Rabbi Henkin felt that this proved the "Chametz sale" to be a fraud and therefore invalid. (Rabbi Moshe Feinstein, on the other hand, believed the sale to still be valid.)

Rabbi Henkin felt that in a case where tuna are being caught, it is halachically permissible to check only a few of each batch and not each individual fish; Rabbi Feinstein, on the other hand, felt that each fish needed to be checked for kosher markings that it was in fact, a tuna and not some other fish.

Manhattan eruv
In 1936, Rabbi Henkin declared that Rabbi Yehoshua Seigel's 1905 Manhattan eruv could no longer be relied on because he had only acquired permission for ten years. However, Rabbi Henkin's main argument why the eruv could no longer be relied on was because of the construction of bridges that crossed Manhattan’s waterfront.

Rabbi Henkin was involved in all the discussions about the Manhattan eruv, and on March 15, 1960, he signed on a Statement of the Vaad L’Maan Tikkun Eruvin B’Manhattan that stated the need to investigate how to bring to fruition the plan for a Manhattan eruv.

On July 12, 1961, Rabbi Henkin wrote a letter stating that there was a sound basis to establish an eruv in Manhattan. Yet, he wrote that until the eruv would receive the written support of most of the rabbanim of Manhattan, the permission for the eruv would only be for times of great need.

The 1979 letter opposing the Flatbush eruv alleges that Rabbi Henkin signed the 1962 letter against the Manhattan eruv. Yet, his name is not on it, and it is on the 1960 letter in favor.

The prevailing view on this matter appears to be that of Rabbi Henkin's, which may be derived from the fact that as of June 2007, the East Side portion of the internal Manhattan Eruv was completed, offering an eruv within Manhattan to Orthodox Jews living on the East, Upper East, and Upper West Sides.  Additionally, there are also two other eruvin in Manhattan's Washington Heights, a neighborhood that also once resisted the drive to establish them; one covering the Yeshiva University area and another covering the Fort Washington area.

Position on Israel
Henkin vigorously opposed Zionism, but once the State of Israel was established he declared the need to support its continued existence, and denounced those who tried to undermine it.  In 1959 he wrote:
I was shocked to read in Chomoteinu (Cheshvan 5719) the slanderous notion that we are required to give our lives to frustrate and resist the efforts of the State of Israel in its struggle against those who would rise up against them. This was stated as a psak din based on "Israel is restricted from rebelling against the nations." (Ketubot 111a) [...] but once done, though the admonition was ignored, we are required to support them with mesirut nefesh. [...] Once the state was declared, anyone who plays into the hands of the nations of the world even where there is no imminent danger, is clearly an informer and pursuer (rodef). All the more when there is danger to destruction of life in so doing. [...] Those essays I wrote before the advent of the state (many of which have been reprinted in my book Leiv Ivra) will testify to the fact that I am not a supporter of the government, and I objected to the entire idea of a state. (It is for this reason I am not a member of Agudah so that I not be judged incorrectly as one who agreed with their position in the founding of the state.) But now it is our obligation that we all support the state in the face of its external enemies and then go on to guide it in the ways of Torah.

Bibliography
Rabbi Norman E. Frimer and Dov I. Frimer, "Reform Marriages in Contemporary Halakhic Responsa," Tradition, Vol. 21, No. 3 (Fall 1984), 7 - 39;

Henkin, Rabbi Yehuda, Equality Lost, Chapter 16 "Rabbi Yosef Eliyahu Henkin", pp. 156–180 (biography of Rabbi Yosef Eliyahu Henkin by his grandson), Jerusalem: Urim Publications, 1999.

References

External links
https://web.archive.org/web/20070909083328/http://www.tzemachdovid.org/gedolim/jo/tpersonality/ravhenkin.html
Letter on Israel
http://eruvonline.blogspot.com/2006/07/part-1-rav-eliyahu-henkin-ztl-and-eruv.html
http://eruvonline.blogspot.com/2006/10/part-2-rav-eliyahu-henkin-ztl-and-eruv.html

1881 births
1973 deaths
American Haredi rabbis
Belarusian Haredi rabbis
People from Klimavichy